The 2019 V.League 1 (known as the Wake Up 247 V.League 1 for sponsorship reasons) season was the 63rd season of the V.League 1, the highest division of Football in Vietnam.

Changes from last season

Team changes
The following teams have changed division since the 2018 season.

To V.League 1
Promoted from V.League 2
 Viettel

From V.League 1
Relegated to V.League 2
 XSKT Cantho

Rule changes

There will be 1.5 relegation places in the 2019 V.League 1 season - the team finishing 14th will be relegated automatically, while the team finishing 13th will play against the team that finishes second in the 2019 V.League 2.

The league will operate the "3+1" foreigner rule, where each team is allowed 3 non-Vietnamese players and 1 naturalized Vietnamese.

Teams

Personnel and kits

Managerial changes

Foreign players
Players name in bold indicates the player is registered during the mid-season transfer window.

 Foreign players who left their clubs after first leg or be replaced because of injuries.
 Player withdrew from the squad due to an injury.

Standings

League table

Positions by round
This table lists the positions of teams after each week of matches. In order to preserve the chronological evolution, any postponed matches are not included to the round at which they were originally scheduled, but added to the full round they were played immediately afterwards. For example, if a match is scheduled for matchday 13, but then postponed and played between days 16 and 17, it will be added to the standings for day 16.

Results

Play-off match
The team finishing 13th faced the runner-up of 2019 V.League 2.

Thanh Hoa won the match and would remain in the 2020 V.League 1.

Attendances

By club

By round 

* Hanoi FC have to play 2 matches in the 23rd and 25th rounds at home without spectators because of a disciplinary decision.

Season statistics

Top scorers

Top assists

Hat-tricks

 Note:
4: scored 4 goals; (H) – Home ; (A) – Away

Awards

Monthly awards

Annual awards

Team of the Year

See also
 2019 V.League 2
 2019 Vietnamese National Football Second League
 2019 Vietnamese National Football Third League

References

Vietnamese Super League seasons
Vietnam
2019 in Vietnamese football